Joni Tuominen (born September 4, 1982) is a Finnish professional ice hockey defenceman who is currently a free agent having last played for Ferencváros in the Erste Liga.

He previously played in Finland for Espoo Blues of the Liiga. As a free agent, Tuominen opened up to the possibility of playing abroad after ten seasons in Finland, when he accepted a (unsuccessful) try-out with Czech club, HC Olomouc on August 11, 2014. Instead, he spent the 2014-15 season playing in Germany's DEL2 with Dresdner Eislöwen. He moved to Poland's STS Sanok for the 2015-16 season, and spent the 2016-17 season with the EIHL's Manchester Phoenix and DVTK Jegesmedvék of the Erste Liga.

References

External links

1982 births
Living people
Dresdner Eislöwen players
DVTK Jegesmedvék players
Espoo Blues players
Ferencvárosi TC (ice hockey) players
Finnish ice hockey defencemen
HC Salamat players
HC TPS players
HPK players
KH Sanok players
Lahti Pelicans players
Manchester Phoenix players
Mikkelin Jukurit players
SaiPa players
Sportspeople from Espoo